Girolamo Savonarola, OP (21 September 1452 – 23 May 1498) or Jerome Savonarola was an ascetic Italian Dominican friar from Ferrara and preacher active in Renaissance Florence. He was known for his prophecies of civic glory, the destruction of secular art and culture, and his calls for Christian renewal. He denounced clerical corruption, despotic rule, and the exploitation of the poor.

In September 1494, when Charles VIII of France invaded Italy and threatened Florence, such prophecies seemed on the verge of fulfilment. While Savonarola intervened with the French king, the Florentines expelled the ruling Medicis and, at the friar's urging, established a "popular" republic. Declaring that Florence would be the New Jerusalem, the world centre of Christianity and "richer, more powerful, more glorious than ever", he instituted an extreme puritanical campaign, enlisting the active help of Florentine youth.

In 1495 when Florence refused to join Pope Alexander VI's Holy League against the French, the Vatican summoned Savonarola to Rome. He disobeyed and further defied the pope by preaching under a ban, highlighting his campaign for reform with processions, bonfires of the vanities, and pious theatricals. In retaliation, the pope excommunicated him in May 1497 and threatened to place Florence under an interdict. A trial by fire proposed by a rival Florentine preacher in April 1498 to test Savonarola's divine mandate turned into a fiasco, and popular opinion turned against him. Savonarola and two of his supporting friars were imprisoned. On 23 May 1498, Church and civil authorities condemned, hanged, and burned the three friars in the main square of Florence.

Savonarola's devotees, the Piagnoni, kept his cause of republican freedom and religious reform alive well into the following century, although the Medici—restored to power in 1512 with the help of the papacy—eventually broke the movement. Some Protestants, including Martin Luther himself, consider Savonarola to be a vital precursor to the Reformation.

Early years 

Savonarola was born on 21 September 1452 in Ferrara to Niccolò di Michele and Elena. His father, Niccolò, was born in Ferrara to a family originally from Padua; his mother, Elena, claimed a lineage from the Bonacossi family of Mantua. She and Niccolò had seven children, of whom Girolamo was third. His grandfather, Michele Savonarola, a noted and successful physician and polymath, oversaw Girolamo's education. The family amassed a great deal of wealth from Michele's medical practice.

After his grandfather's death in 1468 Savonarola may have attended the public school run by Battista Guarino, son of Guarino da Verona, where he would have received his introduction to the classics as well as to the poetry and writings of Petrarch, father of Renaissance humanism. Earning an arts degree at the University of Ferrara, he prepared to enter medical school, following in his grandfather's footsteps. At some point, however, he abandoned his career intentions.

In his early poems he expresses his preoccupation with the state of the Church and of the world. He began to write poetry of an apocalyptic bent, notably "On the Ruin of the World" (1472) and "On the Ruin of the Church" (1475), in which he singled out the papal court at Rome for special obloquy. About the same time he seems to have been thinking about a life in religion. As he later told his biographer, a sermon he heard by a preacher in Faenza persuaded him to abandon the world. Most of his biographers reject or ignore the account of his younger brother and follower, Maurelio (later fra Mauro), that in his youth Girolamo had been spurned by a neighbour, Laudomia Strozzi, to whom he had proposed marriage. True or not, in a letter he wrote to his father when he left home to join the Dominican Order he hints at being troubled by desires of the flesh. There is also a story that on the eve of his departure he dreamed that he was cleansed of such thoughts by a shower of icy water, which prepared him for the ascetic life. In the unfinished treatise he left behind, later called "De contemptu Mundi" or "On Contempt for the World", he calls upon readers to fly from this world of adultery, sodomy, murder and envy.

Savonarola studied Augustine and Thomas Aquinas.  He also studied the scriptures and even memorized parts.

On 25 April 1475 Girolamo Savonarola went to Bologna, where he knocked on the door of the Friary of San Domenico, of the Order of Friars Preacher, and asked to be admitted. As he told his father in his farewell letter, he wanted to become a knight of Christ.

Friar 
In the convent, Savonarola took the vow of obedience proper to his order, and after a year was ordained to the priesthood. He studied Scripture, logic, Aristotelian philosophy and Thomistic theology in the Dominican studium, practised preaching to his fellow friars, and engaged in disputations. He then matriculated in the theological faculty to prepare for an advanced degree. Even as he continued to write devotional works and to deepen his spiritual life, he was openly critical of what he perceived as the decline in convent austerity. In 1478 his studies were interrupted when he was sent to the Dominican priory of Santa Maria degli Angeli in Ferrara as assistant master of novices. The assignment might have been a normal, temporary break from the academic routine, but in Savonarola's case, it was a turning point. One explanation is that he had alienated certain of his superiors, particularly fra Vincenzo Bandelli, or Bandello, a professor at the studium and future master general of the Dominicans, who resented the young friar's opposition to modifying the Order's rules against the ownership of property. In 1482, instead of returning to Bologna to resume his studies, Savonarola was assigned as lector, or teacher, in the Convent of San Marco in Florence.
In San Marco, fra Girolamo (Savonarola) taught logic to the novices, wrote instructional manuals on ethics, logic, philosophy and government, composed devotional works, and prepared his sermons for local congregations. As he recorded in his notes, his preaching was not altogether successful. Florentines were put off by his foreign-sounding Ferrarese speech, his strident voice and (especially to those who valued humanist rhetoric) his inelegant style.

While waiting for a friend in the Convent of San Giorgio, he was studying Scripture when he suddenly conceived "about seven reasons" why the Church was about to be scourged and renewed. He broached these apocalyptic themes in San Gimignano, where he went as Lenten preacher in 1485 and again in 1486, but a year later, when he left San Marco for a new assignment, he had said nothing of his "San Giorgio revelations" in Florence.

Preacher 
For the next several years Savonarola lived as an itinerant preacher with a message of repentance and reform in the cities and convents of north Italy. As his letters to his mother and his writings show, his confidence and sense of mission grew along with his widening reputation. In 1490, he was reassigned to San Marco. It seems that this was due to the initiative of the humanist philosopher-prince, Giovanni Pico della Mirandola, who had heard Savonarola in a formal disputation in Reggio Emilia and been impressed with his learning and piety. Pico was in trouble with the Church for some of his unorthodox philosophical ideas (the famous "900 theses") and was living under the protection of Lorenzo the Magnificent, the Medici de facto ruler of Florence. To have Savonarola beside him as a spiritual counsellor, he persuaded Lorenzo that the friar would bring prestige to the convent of San Marco and its Medici patrons. After some delay, apparently due to the interference of his former professor fra Vincenzo Bandelli, now Vicar General of the Order, Lorenzo succeeded in bringing Savonarola back to Florence, where he arrived in May or June of that year.

Prophet 

Savonarola preached on the First Epistle of John and on the Book of Revelation, drawing such large crowds that he eventually moved to the cathedral. Without mentioning names, he made pointed allusions to tyrants who usurped the freedom of the people, and he excoriated their allies, the rich and powerful who neglected and exploited the poor. Complaining of the evil lives of a corrupt clergy, he now called for repentance and renewal before the arrival of a divine scourge. Scoffers dismissed him as an over-excited zealot and "preacher of the desperate" and sneered at his growing band of followers as Piagnoni—"Weepers" or "Wailers", an epithet they adopted. In 1492 Savonarola warned of "the Sword of the Lord over the earth quickly and soon" and envisioned terrible tribulations to Rome. Around 1493 (these sermons have not survived) he began to prophesy that a New Cyrus was coming over the mountains to begin the renewal of the Church.

In September 1494 King Charles VIII of France crossed the Alps with a formidable army, throwing Italy into political chaos. Many viewed the arrival of King Charles as proof of Savonarola's gift of prophecy. Charles, however, advanced on Florence, sacking Tuscan strongholds and threatening to punish the city for refusing to support his expedition. As the populace took to the streets to expel Piero the Unfortunate, Lorenzo de' Medici's son and successor, Savonarola led a delegation to the camp of the French king in mid-November 1494. He pressed Charles to spare Florence and enjoined him to take up his divinely appointed role as the reformer of the Church. After a short, tense occupation of the city, and another intervention by fra Girolamo (as well as the promise of a huge subsidy), the French resumed their journey southward on 28 November 1494. Savonarola now declared that by answering his call to penitence, the Florentines had begun to build a new Ark of Noah which had saved them from the waters of the divine flood. Even more sensational was the message in his sermon of 10 December:

I announce this good news to the city, that Florence will be more glorious, richer, more powerful than she has ever been; First, glorious in the sight of God as well as of men: and you, O Florence will be the reformation of all Italy, and from here the renewal will begin and spread everywhere, because this is the navel of Italy. Your counsels will reform all by the light and grace that God will give you. Second, O Florence, you will have innumerable riches, and God will multiply all things for you. Third, you will spread your empire, and thus you will have power temporal and spiritual.

This astounding guarantee may have been an allusion to the traditional patriotic myth of Florence as the new Rome, which Savonarola would have encountered in his readings in Florentine history. In any case, it encompassed both temporal power and spiritual leadership.

Reformer 

With Savonarola's advice and support (as a non-citizen and cleric he was ineligible to hold office), a Savonarolan political "party", dubbed "the Frateschi", took shape and steered the friar's program through the councils. The oligarchs most compromised by their service to the Medici were barred from office. A new constitution enfranchised the artisan class, opened minor civic offices to selection by lot, and granted every citizen in good standing the right to a vote in a new parliament, the Consiglio Maggiore, or Great Council. At Savonarola's urging, the Frateschi government, after months of debate, passed a "Law of Appeal" to limit the longtime practice of using exile and capital punishment as factional weapons. Savonarola declared a new era of "universal peace". On 13 January 1495 he preached his great Renovation Sermon to a huge audience in the cathedral, recalling that he had begun prophesying in Florence four years earlier, although the divine light had come to him "more than fifteen, maybe twenty years ago". He now claimed that he had predicted the deaths of Lorenzo de' Medici and of Pope Innocent VIII in 1492 and the coming of the sword to Italy—the invasion of King Charles of France. As he had foreseen, God had chosen Florence, "the navel of Italy", as his favourite and he repeated: if the city continued to do penance and began the work of renewal it would have riches, glory and power.

If the Florentines had any doubt that the promise of worldly power and glory had heavenly sanction, Savonarola emphasised this in a sermon of 1 April 1495, in which he described his mystical journey to the Virgin Mary in heaven. At the celestial throne Savonarola presents the Holy Mother a crown made by the Florentine people and presses her to reveal their future. Mary warns that the way will be hard both for the city and for him, but she assures him that God will fulfil his promises: Florence will be "more glorious, more powerful and richer than ever, extending its wings farther than anyone can imagine". She and her heavenly minions will protect the city against its enemies and support its alliance with the French. In the New Jerusalem that is Florence peace and unity will reign. Based on such visions, Savonarola promoted theocracy, and declared Christ the king of Florence. He saw sacred art as a tool to promote this worldview, and he was therefore only opposed to secular art, which he saw as worthless and potentially damaging.

Buoyed by liberation and prophetic promise, the Florentines embraced Savonarola's campaign to rid the city of "vice". At his repeated insistence, new laws were passed against "sodomy" (which included male and female same-sex relations), adultery, public drunkenness, and other moral transgressions, while his lieutenant Fra Silvestro Maruffi organised boys and young men to patrol the streets to curb immodest dress and behaviour. For a time, Pope Alexander VI (1492–1503) tolerated friar Girolamo's strictures against the Church, but he was moved to anger when Florence declined to join his new Holy League against the French invader, and blamed it on Savonarola's pernicious influence. An exchange of letters between the pope and the friar ended in an impasse which Savonarola tried to break by sending the pope "a little book" recounting his prophetic career and describing some of his more dramatic visions. This was the Compendium of Revelations, a self-dramatization which was one of the farthest-reaching and most popular of his writings.

The pope was not mollified. He summoned the friar to appear before him in Rome, and when Savonarola refused, pleading ill health and confessing that he was afraid of being attacked on the journey, Alexander banned him from further preaching. For some months Savonarola obeyed, but when he saw his influence slipping he defied the pope and resumed his sermons, which became more violent in tone. He not only attacked secret enemies at home whom he rightly suspected of being in league with the papal Curia, he condemned the conventional, or "tepid", Christians who were slow to respond to his calls. He dramatised his moral campaign with special Masses for the youth, processions, bonfires of the vanities and religious theatre in San Marco. He and his close friend, the humanist poet Girolamo Benivieni, composed lauds and other devotional songs for the Carnival processions of 1496, 1497 and 1498, replacing the bawdy Carnival songs of the era of Lorenzo de' Medici. These continued to be copied and performed after his death, along with songs composed by Piagnoni in his memory. A number of them have survived.

Proto-Protestant 

Savonarola, like the later reformers, desired a return to the "early apostolic simplicity". Many Protestants view Savonarola as a precursor to the reformation with respect to his views on "the doctrine of justification, his emphasis on individual faith, his emphasis on the authority of scripture and compassion for the poor". The writings of Savonarola spread widely to Germany and Switzerland, and due to Savonarola's life and death, many people started to see the papacy as corrupted and sought a new reform of the church. Many people saw him as a martyr, including Martin Luther, who was influenced by Savonarola's writings. Savonarola's beliefs on the doctrine of justification are similar in some respects to Martin Luther’s teachings, stating that we are not justified by ourselves. Savonarola perhaps even influenced John Calvin, but this is a matter of historical debate. 

Savonarola never abandoned the dogmas of the Roman Catholic Church; for example, Savonarola held to a belief in seven sacraments and that the Church of Rome is "the mother of all other churches and the pope its head." However his protests against papal corruption, reliance on the bible as the main guide link Savonarola with the later reformation. Savonarola himself held scripture as a very high authority, he himself stated: ”I preach the regeneration of the Church, taking the Scriptures as my sole guide.". It is untrue that God’s grace is obtained by pre-existing works of merit as though works and deserts were the cause of predestination. On the contrary, these are the result of predestination. Tell me, Peter; tell me, O Magdalene, wherefore are ye in paradise? Confess that not by your own merits have ye obtained salvation, but by the goodness of God  — Girolamo Savonarola.Other quotes from Savonarola such as "Not by their own deservings, O Lord, or by their own works have they been saved, lest any man should be able to boast, but because it seemed good in Thy sight." made Martin Luther say that even though the theology of Savonarola wasn't perfect, it was still an example of true Christian theology. Martin Luther later stated about Savonarola:Christ canonizes Savonarola through us even though popes and papists burst to pieces over it — Martin LutherSavonarola while revering the office of the papacy, nevertheless criticized the pope Alexander VI and his papal court. Savonarola even prophecied that Rome will come under judgement from God.the Pope may command me to do something that contravenes the law of Christian love or the Gospel. But, if he did so command, I would say to him, thou art no shepherd. Not the Roman Church, but thou errest 

Who are the fat kine of Bashan on the mountains of Samaria? I say they are the courtesans of Italy and Rome. Or, are there none? A thousand are too few for Rome, 10,000, 12,000, 14,000 are too few for Rome. Prepare thyself, O Rome, for great will be thy punishments - Girolamo SavonarolaCatholic sources, however, criticize the inclusion of Savonarola as a Protestant forerunner, because much of his theology still aligned with Rome. Despite inspiring some Protestant reformers, Savonarola also influenced some leaders of the Counter-Reformation.

Excommunication and death 

On 12 May 1497, Pope Alexander VI excommunicated Savonarola and threatened the Florentines with an interdict if they persisted in harbouring him. After describing the Church as a whore, Savonarola was excommunicated for heresy and sedition.

On 18 March 1498, after much debate and steady pressure from a worried government, Savonarola withdrew from public preaching. Under the stress of excommunication, he composed his spiritual masterpiece, the Triumph of the Cross, a celebration of the victory of the Cross over sin and death and an exploration of what it means to be a Christian. This he summed up in the theological virtue of caritas, or love. In loving their neighbours, Christians return the love which they have received from their Creator and Savior. Savonarola hinted at performing miracles to prove his divine mission, but when a rival Franciscan preacher proposed to test that mission by walking through fire, he lost control of public discourse. Without consulting him, his confidant Fra Domenico da Pescia offered himself as his surrogate and Savonarola felt he could not afford to refuse. The first trial by fire in Florence in over four hundred years was set for 7 April. A crowd filled the central square, eager to see if God would intervene, and if so, on which side. The nervous contestants and their delegations delayed the start of the contest for hours. A sudden rain drenched the spectators and government officials cancelled the proceedings. The crowd disbanded angrily; the burden of proof had been on Savonarola, and he was blamed for the fiasco. A mob assaulted the convent of San Marco.

Fra Girolamo, Fra Domenico, and Fra Silvestro Maruffi were arrested and imprisoned. Under torture Savonarola confessed to having invented his prophecies and visions, then recanted, then confessed again. In his prison cell in the tower of the government palace he composed meditations on Psalms 51 and 31. On the morning of 23 May 1498, the three friars were led out into the main square where, before a tribunal of high clerics and government officials, they were condemned as heretics and schismatics, and sentenced to die forthwith. Stripped of their Dominican garments in ritual degradation, they mounted the scaffold in their thin white shirts. Each on separate gallows, they were hanged, while fires were ignited below them to consume their bodies. To prevent devotees from searching for relics, their ashes were carted away and scattered in the Arno.

Aftermath 
Resisting censorship and exile, the friars of San Marco fostered a cult of "the three martyrs" and venerated Savonarola as a saint. They encouraged women in local convents and surrounding towns to find mystical inspiration in his example, and, by preserving many of his sermons and writings, they helped keep his political as well as his religious ideas alive. The return of the Medici in 1512 ended the Savonarola-inspired republic and intensified pressure against the movement, although both were briefly revived in 1527 when the Medici were once again forced out. In 1530 Pope Clement VII (Giulio de' Medici), with the help of soldiers of the Holy Roman Emperor, restored Medici rule, and Florence became a hereditary dukedom.

Savonarola's contemporary Niccolò Machiavelli discusses the friar in Chapter VI of his book The Prince, writing:

Savonarolan religious ideas found a reception elsewhere. In Germany and Switzerland the early Protestant reformers, most notably Martin Luther himself, read some of the friar's writings and praised him as a martyr and forerunner whose ideas on faith and grace anticipated Luther's own doctrine of justification by faith alone. In France many of his works were translated and published and Savonarola came to be regarded as a precursor of evangelical, or Huguenot, reform though Savonarola himself had remained a believer in the dogmas of the Catholic church and even in his last major work had defended the institution of the papacy. Within the Dominican Order Savonarola was seen as a devotional figure ("the evolving image of a Counter-Reformation saintly prelate"), and in this benevolent guise his memory lived on. Philip Neri, founder of the Oratorians, a Florentine who had been educated by the San Marco Dominicans, also defended Savonarola's memory. In Wittenberg, the hometown of Martin Luther, a statue of Girolamo Savonarola was erected to honour him.

In the mid-nineteenth century, the "New Piagnoni" found inspiration in the friar's writings and sermons for the Italian national awakening known as the Risorgimento. By emphasising his political activism over his puritanism and cultural conservatism they restored Savonarola's voice for radical political change. The venerable pre-Reformation icon ceded to the fiery Renaissance reformer. This somewhat anachronistic image, fortified by much new scholarship, informed the major new biography by Pasquale Villari, who regarded Savonarola's preaching against Medici despotism as the model for the Italian struggle for liberty and national unification. In Germany, the Catholic theologian and church historian Joseph Schnitzer edited and published contemporary sources which illuminated Savonarola's career. In 1924 he crowned his vast research with a comprehensive study of Savonarola's life and times in which he presented the friar as the last best hope of the Catholic Church before the catastrophe of the Protestant Reformation. In the Italian People's Party founded by Don Luigi Sturzo in 1919, Savonarola was revered as a champion of social justice, and after 1945 he was held up as a model of reformed Catholicism by leaders of the Christian Democratic Party. From this milieu, in 1952, came the third of the major Savonarola biographies, the Vita di Girolamo Savonarola by Roberto Ridolfi. For the next half century Ridolfi was the guardian of the friar's saintly memory as well as the dean of Savonarola research which he helped grow into a scholarly industry. Today, with most of Savonarola's treatises and sermons and many of the contemporary sources (chronicles, diaries, government documents and literary works) available in critical editions, scholars can provide fresh, better informed assessments of his character and his place in the Renaissance, the Reformation and modern European history. The present-day Church has considered his beatification.

Bibliography

Savonarola's writings 

Almost thirty volumes of Savonarola's sermons and writings have so far been published in the Edizione nazionale delle Opere di Girolamo Savonarola (Rome, Angelo Belardetti, 1953 to the present). For editions of the 15th and 16th centuries see Catalogo delle edizioni di Girolamo Savonarola (secc. xv–xvi) ed. P. Scapecchi (Florence, 1998).
 Prison Meditations on Psalms 51 and 31 ed. John Patrick Donnelly, S.J.
 The Compendium of Revelations in Bernard McGinn ed. Apocalyptic Spirituality: Treatises and Letters of Lactantius, Adso of Montier-en-Der, Joachim of Fiore, the Franciscan Spirituals, Savonarola (New York, 1979)
 Savonarola A Guide to Righteous Living and Other Works ed. Konrad Eisenbichler (Toronto, Centre for Reformation and Renaissance Studies, 2003)
 Selected Writings of Girolamo Savonarola Religion and Politics, 1490–1498 ed. Anne Borelli and Maria Pastore Passaro (New Haven, Yale University Press, 2006)

Cultural influence

Music 
 William Byrd used the text of Savonarola's Infelix ego in his work by the same name as part of the Cantiones Sacrae 1591 xxiv–xvi.
 Charles Villiers Stanford wrote an opera titled Savonarola, which had its premiere in Hamburg on 18 April 1884.
 Luigi Dallapiccola used text from Savonarola's Meditation on the Psalm My hope is in Thee, O Lord in his 1938 choral work Canti di prigionia.

Fiction 

 Lenau, Nikolaus, Savonarola (poem, 1837)
 Eliot, George, Romola (novel, 1863)
 Mann, Thomas, Fiorenza (play, 1909)
 Herrmann, Bernhard, Savonarola im Feuer (1909)
 The 1917 story, "'Savonarola' Brown," by Max Beerbohm (published in Seven Men), concerns an aspiring playwright, author of an unfinished, unintentionally absurd retelling of the life of Savonarola. (His four-act play took him nine years to write, is eighteen pages long, and features a romance between Savonarola and Lucrezia Borgia, and also cameos by Dante Alighieri, Leonardo da Vinci, and St. Francis of Assisi.)
 Van Wyck, William, Savonarola: A Biography in Dramatic Episodes (1926)
 Hines and King, Fire of Vanity (play, 1930)
 Salacrou, Armand, Le terre est ronde (1938)
 The novel Kámen a bolest ("suffering and the stone") (1942), Karel Schulz's historical novel about the life of Michelangelo, features Savonarola as an important character.
 Bacon, Wallace A., Savonarola: A Play in Nine Scenes (1950)
 The Agony and the Ecstasy (1961), Irving Stone's novelisation of Michelangelo's life, depicts the events in Florence from the Medici's point of view.
 The fourth segment of Walerian Borowczyk's 1974 anthology film, Immoral Tales, is set during the reign of Pope Alexander VI. A character called "Friar Hyeronimus Savonarola", played by Philippe Desboeuf, holds a sermon in which he publicly condemns the corruption of the church and the sexual depravity of the papacy. Borowczyk juxtaposes Savonarola's sermon with the Pope enjoying a threesome with his daughter, Lucrezia Borgia, and his son, Cesare Borgia. Savonarola is arrested and publicly burned to death.
 In the 1976 film Network, the network programming executive played by Faye Dunaway refers to crusading reporter Howard Beale as "a magnificent messianic figure, inveighing against the hypocrisies of our times, a strip Savonarola, Monday through Friday".
 In her novel The Passion of New Eve (1977), Angela Carter describes the preaching leader of an army of god-fearing child soldiers as a "precocious Savonarola".
 The novel The Palace (1978) by Chelsea Quinn Yarbro features Savonarola as the main antagonist of the vampire Saint Germain.
 The historical fantasy novel The Dragon Waiting (1984) by John M. Ford has Savonarola as one of the antagonists in chapter 3, set in the Medici court.
 The novel Sabbath's Theater (1995) by Philip Roth makes reference to Savonarola.
 The novel The Birth of Venus (2003 ) by Sarah Dunant makes extensive references to Savonarola.
 In episode 7 (2003) of the manga-anime series Gunslinger Girl, two of the protagonists, Jean and Rico, visit Florence. There Savonarola is mentioned among other famous people who lived in the city, while he shares his surname with one of the series antagonists.
 The novel The Rule of Four (2004) by Ian Caldwell and Dustin Thomason makes extensive references to Savonarola.
 In the novel I, Mona Lisa (2006) (UK title Painting Mona Lisa) by Jeanne Kalogridis, he is given a negative slant, as the Medicis are portrayed as sympathetic and noble.
 The novel The Enchantress of Florence (2008) by Salman Rushdie
 The young adult novel The Smile (2008) by Donna Jo Napoli shows Savonarola as he was observed by a young Mona Lisa.
 In the novel Wolf Hall (2009) by Hilary Mantel, the Bonfire of the Vanities is brought up in a story by the protagonist, Thomas Cromwell.
 Savonarola appears as a main assassination target in the videogame Assassin's Creed II (2009).
 In the novel, The Poet Prince (2010), Kathleen McGowan portrays him as an enemy of the Tuscan people in their pursuit of artistic fame during his reign.
 Savonarola's life story is explored in the novel Fanatics (2011) by William Bell and his ghost plays an important role in the story.
 In Showtime's The Borgias, Savonarola is a recurring character in the two first seasons and is portrayed by Steven Berkoff. His burning takes place in the episode The Confession.
 In the Netflix series Borgia, Savonarola is portrayed by Iain Glen in season 2 (2013).
 Savonarola is a character in Canadian playwright Jordan Tannahill's 2016 play Botticelli in the Fire.
 In the Rai Fiction series Medici, Savonarola is portrayed by Francesco Montanari in season 2 (2018).
 The historical fantasy and alternate history novel Lent (2019) by Jo Walton is a retelling of Savonarola's life.

References

Further reading 
Dall'Aglio, Stefano, Savonarola and Savonarolism (Toronto: Centre for Reformation and Renaissance Studies. 2010).
Herzig,Tamar, Savonarola's Women: Visions and Reform in Renaissance Italy (Chicago: University of Chicago Press. 2008).
Lowinsky, Edward E., Music in the Culture of the Renaissance and Other Essays (University of Chicago Press, 1989).
Macey, Patrick, Bonfire Songs: Savonarola's Musical Legacy (Oxford, Clarendon Press, 1998).
Martines, Lauro, Fire in the City: Savonarola and the Struggle for Renaissance Florence (New York: Oxford University Press, 2006) 
Meltzoff, Stanley, Botticelli, Signorelli and Savonarola: Theologia Poetica and Painting from Boccaccio to Poliziano (Florence: L.S. Olschki, 1987).
Morris, Samantha, The Pope’s Greatest Adversary: Girolamo Savonarola (South Yorkshire: Pen and Sword History, 2021).
Polizzotto, Lorenzo, The Elect Nation: The Savonarolan Movement in Florence, 1494–1545 (Oxford: Clarendon Press; New York: Oxford University Press, 1994).
Ridolfi, Roberto, Vita di Girolamo Savonarola, ed. A.F. Verde (Florence, 6th ed., 1997).
Roeder, Ralph Edmund LeClercq, The Man of the Renaissance: Four Lawgivers: Savonarola, Machiavelli, Castiglione, Aretino (The Viking Press, 1933).
Steinberg, Ronald M., Fra Girolamo Savonarola, Florentine Art, and Renaissance Historiography (Athens: Ohio University Press, 1977).
Smiles, L.L.D., Samuel, "Endurance to the End—Savonarola", Ch. VI of Duty: With Illustrations of Courage, Patience, & Endurance (London: John Murray, 1880).
Strathern, Paul, Death in Florence: The Medici, Savanarola, and the Battle for the Soul of a Renaissance City (New York, London: Pegasus Books, 2015).
Weinstein, Donald, Savonarola: The Rise and Fall of a Renaissance Prophet (New Haven: Yale University Press, 2011) 
Weinstein, Donald and Hotchkiss, Valerie R., eds. Girolamo Savonarola Piety, Prophecy and Politics in Renaissance Florence, Catalogue of the Exhibition (Dallas, Bridwell Library, 1994).

External links 

 Catholic Encyclopedia entry on Girolamo Savonarola
 Predica dell'arte del bene morire From the Rare Book and Special Collections Division at the Library of Congress
 Savonarola's Visions, documentary about Girolamo Savonarola

 
Executed Roman Catholic priests
Italian Roman Catholics
Italian torture victims
Italian Dominicans
People excommunicated by the Catholic Church
People executed by the Papal States by burning
People executed for heresy
Religious leaders from Ferrara
Rulers of Florence
University of Ferrara alumni
1452 births
1498 deaths
15th-century Italian Roman Catholic priests
Proto-Protestants
Dominican Order in Florence
Friars of San Marco, Florence